This article presents a list of the historical events and publications of Australian literature during 1934.

Books 

 Martin Boyd – Scandal of Spring
 Eleanor Dark – Prelude to Christopher
 Arthur Gask
 The Hidden Door
 The Judgement of Larose
 The Poisoned Goblet
 Vance Palmer – The Swain Family
 Alice Grant Rosman – Somebody Must
 Steele Rudd – Grey Green Homestead
 Christina Stead – Seven Poor Men of Sydney
 E. V. Timms – Conflict

Short stories 

 Vance Palmer – Sea and Spinifex
 Henry Handel Richardson – The End of Childhood and Other Stories
 Christina Stead – The Salzburg Tales

Children's 

 Ruth Bedford – Hundreds and Thousands
 P. L. Travers – Mary Poppins
 Alan J. Villiers – Whalers of the Midnight Sun
 Dorothy Wall
 Blinky Bill Grows Up
 The Tale of Bridget and the Bees

Poetry 

 Emily Coungeau – Fern Leaves: Poems and Verse
 Rudyard Kipling – "Ode : Melbourne Shrine of Remembrance, 1934"
 Will Lawson – "The Bunyip"
 Furnley Maurice – Melbourne Odes
 John Shaw Neilson – The Collected Works of John Shaw Neilson
 Patrick White – "The Ploughman"

Awards and honours

Literary

Births 

A list, ordered by date of birth (and, if the date is either unspecified or repeated, ordered alphabetically by surname) of births in 1934 of Australian literary figures, authors of written works or literature-related individuals follows, including year of death.

 17 February – Barry Humphries, actor and writer
 20 March – David Malouf, novelist and poet
 6 May – Chris Wallace-Crabbe, poet
 20 June – Margaret Scott, poet and novelist (died 2005)
30 June – Rod Milgate, playwright and painter (died 2020)
 5 August – James McQueen, novelist (died 1998)
 17 August – Inga Clendinnen, academic and author (died 2016)

Deaths 

A list, ordered by date of death (and, if the date is either unspecified or repeated, ordered alphabetically by surname) of deaths in 1934 of Australian literary figures, authors of written works or literature-related individuals follows, including year of birth.

 22 December – Grace Ethel Martyr, poet (born 1888)

See also 
 1934 in poetry
 List of years in literature
 List of years in Australian literature
1934 in literature
1933 in Australian literature
1934 in Australia
1935 in Australian literature

References

Literature
Australian literature by year
20th-century Australian literature